These are some of the links to articles that are telephone related.

See Category:Telephony for many more links

0-9
 116 telephone number
 800 number

A-F
 Alexander Graham Bell
 Answering machine
 Antonio Meucci
 Area code
 Bell labs
 Bell System
 Call Login Systems
 Carterfone
 Cell site
 Cellular network
 Charles Bourseul
 Cordless telephone
 Martin Cooper
 Demon Dialing
 Dial tone
 Elisha Gray
 Elisha Gray and Alexander Bell telephone controversy
 Emergency phone
 Emile Berliner
 Fax
 Federal telephone excise tax
 Francis Blake (telephone)

G-L
 Geographic number
 Harmonised service of social value
 History of mobile phones
 History of the telephone
 Hybrid routing
 Innocenzo Manzetti 
 Invention of the telephone
 Jipp curve
 Local loop

M-R
 Mobile phone
 Philipp Reis
 Phreaking
 Plain old telephone service (POTS)
 Private branch exchange
 Public switched telephone network
 Rate center
 Regional Bell Operating Company
 Ringaround

S-Z
 Satellite phone
 Sidetone
 Telecommunications
 Telephone
 Telephone call
 Telephone directory
 Telephone exchange
 Telephone line
 Telephone newspaper
 Telephone number
 Telephone switchboard
 Telephone tapping
 Telephony
 Thomas Edison
 Timeline of the telephone
 Tip and ring (Wiring terminology)
 Toll-free telephone number
 Zone Usage Measurement

Telephony
Telecommunications equipment
Telephone connectors
Telephone directory publishing companies
Telephone directory publishing companies of the United States
Telephone exchanges
Telephone numbers